The Deboyne Islands are an atoll, composed of a group of reefs and islands in the north of the Louisiade Archipelago, Papua New Guinea.

Geography

Islands in the Deboyne Islands include Panaeati (the northernmost), Panapompom, Nivani, Pana Uya Wana, Rara, Losai, Nibub and Passage Island.

History
The Deboyne Islands were discovered in 1793 by Antoine Bruni d'Entrecasteaux. He named the islands after Pierre Étienne Bourgeois de Boynes, who was the Marine and Colonial Minister of France at that time.
During World War II, the islands were used as a seaplane outpost by the Imperial Japanese Navy, from 5–12 May 1942.

Population
The settlements in the main island Panaeati are all located on the south coast of the island, facing the lagoon.
the language spoken on the islands is Misima-Paneati language.

Economy
Nivani, the small island south of Panapompom, has a small vocational school and slipway.
Yachts are regular visitors to the Louisiade Archipelago. Nivani is a favorite anchorage for these yachts, with averages of about 15 yachts a year.  A small ecotourist resort was recently built at Nivani that would respect the environment, yet provide business opportunities for the population of Panapompom community. The resort is a success especially with yachtsman, divers and film crews.

See also
Japanese seaplane tender Kamikawa Maru
American Deboyne Strike (1942)

References

Bibliography

External links

Atolls of Papua New Guinea
Islands of Milne Bay Province
Louisiade Archipelago